The Philadelphia Sphas were an American professional basketball team active from 1917 to 1959. Throughout the team's tenure, they played in many ramshackle leagues, which was commonplace in the time before the formation of the NBA. Most of the Sphas' existence was spent in the Eastern Basketball League and the American Basketball League. They won twelve championships, one each in the short-lived Philadelphia League and Philadelphia Basket Ball League, three in the Eastern Basketball League, and seven in the American Basketball League.

References